New York State Route 488 (NY 488) is a state highway entirely in Ontario County, New York, in the United States. NY 488 also passes through the hamlet of Orleans, located within the town of Phelps. Although NY 488 is signed as a north–south highway, most of the route follows an east–west alignment. NY 488 was originally designated as part of NY 88 in the 1930 renumbering of state highways in New York. NY 88 was truncated to the village of Phelps in August 1972, at which time its former routing between NY 21 and NY 96 was renumbered to NY 488, eliminating an overlap with NY 96.

Route description

NY 488 begins at an intersection with NY 21 in the hamlet of Chapin, a small community within the Ontario County town of Hopewell. Just past the railroad, the route makes a slight turn to the northeast for  before curving back to the east and continuing across open farmland. As NY 488 crosses the town of Hopewell, it serves a handful of isolated homes and intersects several north–south highways of local importance, including County Road 47 (CR 47). The route continues eastward into the town of Phelps, where it serves a pair of large farms on its way to the small hamlet of Orleans, located on both the western bank of Flint Creek and the right-of-way of the now-defunct Pennsylvania Railroad (PRR).

In the western portion of Orleans, NY 488 intersects with the north–south CR 20, which leads to most of the hamlet's residences. NY 488, meanwhile, bypasses most of the community to the northwest as it makes a gradual turn to the north to follow Flint Creek and the old PRR right-of-way toward the village of Phelps. Outside of Orleans, the route reenters mostly rural surroundings as it approaches a junction with CR 43. While CR 43 heads north toward Clifton Springs, NY 488 turns to the northeast, following the creek and the old rail bed past the large reservoir serving the village of Newark. At an intersection with Trimble and Griffith Roads, the highway turns back to the north, matching a similar curve in the creek's routing. NY 488 continues on, crossing the former right-of-way of the Lehigh Valley Railroad and passing Midlakes High School on an otherwise nondescript stretch before ending at an intersection with NY 96 west of the village of Phelps.

History

On May 25, 1915, the state of New York let a contract to improve an  highway connecting the city of Canandaigua to the hamlet of Orleans to state highway standards. The reconstruction of the highway was 70 percent complete by 1920 and finished by 1926, by which time the highway was added to the state highway system as State Highway 1278 (SH 1278). The north–south highway connecting Orleans to the village of Phelps was rebuilt to state highway standards  as SH 1863. In the 1930 renumbering of state highways in New York, SH 1278 and SH 1863 became part of the new NY 88, which began in the village of Sodus and extended southward through Phelps to the intersection of West Avenue and Main Street in Canandaigua. NY 88 was truncated on its southern end to Phelps . Its former routing from NY 21 in the hamlet of Chapin to NY 96 west of Phelps was renumbered to NY 488 as part of a project statewide to eliminate useless overlaps such as NY 88 and NY 96.

Major intersections

See also

References

External links

488
Transportation in Ontario County, New York